The Bachelor's Romance is a 1915 American comedy silent film directed by John Emerson and written by Martha Morton. The film stars John Emerson, Lorraine Huling, George LeGuere, Robert Cain, Sybilla Pope and Maggie Fisher. The film was released on February 11, 1915, by Paramount Pictures.

Plot

Cast 
John Emerson as David Holmes
Lorraine Huling as Sylvia
George Le Guere as Harry
Robert Cain as Gerald
Sybilla Pope as Helen
Maggie Fisher as Aunt Clem
Philip Hahn as Savage
Thomas McGrath as Willum
J. Findlay as Martin

References

External links 
 

1915 films
1910s English-language films
Silent American comedy films
1915 comedy films
Paramount Pictures films
American black-and-white films
American silent feature films
1910s American films